The Bavarian Class BB II engines were Mallet type, saturated steam locomotives in the service of the Royal Bavarian State Railways (Königlich Bayerische Staats-Eisenbahnen).

They were specially designed for branch lines with tight curves and supplied in two series. The first series comprised 29 engines and was built between 1899 and 1903. The other two machines were delivered in 1908 to the state railway and were somewhat longer and heavier than the other locomotives. 

Although the Deutsche Reichsbahn-Gesellschaft took over all the vehicles in 1925 as DRG Class 98.7, all bar three were retired during the 1930s due to their unsatisfactory riding performance. The last three engines were used after 1940 as industrial locomotives.

One example, the 98 727, was sold in 1943 to the Regensburg factory of Südzucker AG and was given the operating number 4. It was donated in 1972 to the Darmstadt-Kranichstein Railway Museum (Eisenbahnmuseum Darmstadt-Kranichstein) and is still preserved today. 

98 713 was used in Regensburg as well, was exported to Albania in 1943 to be used by Wehrmacht and Hekurudha Shqiptare. Served until 1950 and still could be seen in 1985.

External links 
 Photograph of 98 727 as a museum locomotive (1973)

References and notes

Mallet locomotives
Locomotives of Bavaria
0-4-4-0 locomotives
Standard gauge locomotives of Germany
Maffei locomotives
Railway locomotives introduced in 1899
B′B n4vt locomotives